Sebastián Ignacio Julio Muñoz (born 26 December 1996) is a Chilean footballer who plays as a striker for Luis Ángel Firpo in the Primera División de El Salvador.

Club career
A product of Deportes Santa Cruz youth system, Julio made his professional debut in the 2016 season. In his homeland, he also has played for Deportes Colina, previously AC Colina, Fernández Vial, Independiente de Cauquenes and Deportes Iberia. With AC Colina, he got a promotion to the Segunda División Profesional in the 2018 season, and scored two goals in the first win of the club in a professional league in the 2019 season, under the name of Deportes Colina.

In 2023, he moved abroad and signed with Luis Ángel Firpo in the Primera División de El Salvador alongside his compatriot Felipe Brito.

References

External links

1996 births
Living people
Sportspeople from Viña del Mar
Chilean footballers
Chilean expatriate footballers
Deportes Santa Cruz footballers
Deportes Colina footballers
C.D. Arturo Fernández Vial footballers
Independiente de Cauquenes footballers
Deportes Iberia footballers
C.D. Luis Ángel Firpo footballers
Segunda División Profesional de Chile players
Salvadoran Primera División players
Chilean expatriate sportspeople in El Salvador
Expatriate footballers in El Salvador
Association football forwards